Ilídio is a Portuguese language masculine given name, and may refer to:

 Ilídio Machado (1914-) co-founder of Angola's MPLA liberation movement
 Ilídio Vale (1957-) manager of the Portuguese U-19 football team
 Vítor Ilídio Castanheira Penas (1977-), a Portuguese footballer
 Carlos Ilídio Moreno Gomes aka Piguita (1970-), Cape Verdean footballer
 :pt:Ilídio do Amaral (1926-), Portuguese geographer
 :pt:Ilídio de Araújo (1925-), Portuguese landscape architect
 :pt:Ilídio Pinto Leandro (1950-), Brazilian bishop, Bishop of Viseu
 Ilídio da Costa Leite de Pinho (1938-), Portuguese businessman, founder of :pt:Fundação Ilídio Pinho for the promotion of science
 :pt:Ilídio Botelho Gonçalves (1922-2011), Portuguese forestry expert

References

Given names